2010 Hockey World Cup may refer to:

2010 Men's Hockey World Cup, a field hockey tournament in New Delhi, India
2010 Women's Hockey World Cup, a field hockey tournament in Rosario, Argentina

See also
2010 IIHF World Championship, the men's world championship in ice hockey